Tomina is the seat of the homonymous municipality located in the Tomina Province in the Chuquisaca Department of Bolivia. At the time of the 2001 census it had 983 inhabitants.

References

External links 
 Population data and map of Tomina Municipality

Populated places in Chuquisaca Department